George T. Ashe (February 6, 1905 – May 1975) was an American politician who served in the Massachusetts House of Representatives and as the fifty fifth Mayor of Lowell, Massachusetts. Ashe was the last administrative mayor of Lowell. In 1944 Lowell adopted the Massachusetts "Plan E" form of municipal government, under which the office of the mayor became a strictly ceremonial one.

Early life
Ashe was born February 6, 1905, in Lowell, Massachusetts, to John Joseph and Mary Ellen (Sullivan) Ashe.

Corruption conviction
In October 1942 Ashe was convicted on charges of conspiracy involving bribery for city purchases.  In November 1942 Ashe was sentenced to a year in the House of Correction by Judge Vincent T. Erogna. He began his sentence on  December 22, 1942.

See also
 1935–1936 Massachusetts legislature
 1937–1938 Massachusetts legislature
 1939 Massachusetts legislature

References

1905 births
1975 deaths
Democratic Party members of the Massachusetts House of Representatives
Mayors of Lowell, Massachusetts
American Roman Catholics
Massachusetts politicians convicted of crimes
20th-century American politicians